Ophioblennius is a genus of combtooth blennies native to the Atlantic and to the Pacific coasts of the Americas.

Species
There are currently five recognized species in this genus:
 Ophioblennius atlanticus (Valenciennes, 1836) (Horseface blenny)
 Ophioblennius clippertonensis V. G. Springer, 1962 (Clipperton blenny)
 Ophioblennius macclurei (Silvester, 1915) (Redlip blenny)
 Ophioblennius steindachneri D. S. Jordan & Evermann, 1898 (Large-banded blenny)
 Ophioblennius trinitatus A. Miranda-Ribeiro, 1919 (Triple Blenny)

Description
Ophioblennius blennies have cylindrical bodies and blunt heads with cirri.

Habitat

References

 
Salarinae
Taxa named by Theodore Gill
Marine fish genera